In Mandaeism, ʿUr is the king of the World of Darkness (alma ḏ-hšuka) or underworld. He is the son of Ruha, the queen of the underworld, and her brother Gaf (also spelled Gap), one of the giants in the World of Darkness described in book 5 of the Ginza Rabba. Ur is typically portrayed as a large, ferocious dragon or snake. He is represented by the image of a serpent on the skandola talisman.

The Mandaean Book of John contrasts Ur, the King of Darkness, with the King of Light (Hayyi Rabbi).

Names
Ur has also been referred in Mandaean texts as Leviathan (from Right Ginza 15.1). According to the Right Ginza 5.1, his mother Ruha called him "the Great Giant, the Power of Darkness" (gabara rba, haila ḏ-hšuka).

Ur's epithets include Bar-Spag and other names.

Parallels
Aldihisi (2008) compares Ur to Tiamat in Babylonian mythology and Yaldabaoth in Gnostic literature.

See also
Shdum, also known as the "King of Darkness"
Leviathan
Nagaraja
Tiamat
Yaldabaoth
Ahriman
Asrestar
Prince of Darkness (Manichaeism)

References

Demons in Mandaeism
Legendary serpents
Incest in mythology
Leviathan